Jean Rioux (born June 9, 1953) is an educator, businessman and Quebec politician, who served as the Member of Parliament for Saint-Jean as a member of the Liberal Party of Canada from 2015 until 2019. He previously represented Iberville in the Quebec National Assembly from 2003 to 2007 as a Liberal.

Early life 
He was born in Trois-Rivières, Quebec, the son of Richard Rioux and Janine Vincent, and was educated at the Université du Québec à Trois-Rivières and the Université Laval. Rioux taught history and economics in Marcellin-Champagnat secondary school in Iberville.

Political career 
Rioux served on the municipal council for Iberville from 1991 to 1995 and was mayor from 1995 to 2001. Rioux was elected to the National Assembly of Quebec in Iberville the 2003 general election but was defeated by André Riedl of the Action démocratique du Québec when he ran for reelection in 2007.

Rioux stood as the Liberal Party's candidate for Saint-Jean in the 2015 federal election, and was elected in the New Democrat open seat.

Rioux was defeated at the 2019 federal election by the Bloc Québécois candidate Christine Normandin on a large swing.

Electoral record

Federal

Provincial

References 

 
 Official Website

1953 births
French Quebecers
Living people
Mayors of places in Quebec
Quebec Liberal Party MNAs
People from Saint-Jean-sur-Richelieu
People from Trois-Rivières
Liberal Party of Canada MPs
Members of the House of Commons of Canada from Quebec
Quebec municipal councillors
Université du Québec à Trois-Rivières alumni
Université Laval alumni
Canadian schoolteachers
21st-century Canadian politicians